was the fifth vessel to be commissioned in the 19-vessel  destroyers built for the Imperial Japanese Navy in the late-1930s under the Circle Three Supplementary Naval Expansion Program (Maru San Keikaku).

Background
The Kagerō-class destroyers were outwardly almost identical to the preceding light cruiser-sized , with improvements made by Japanese naval architects to improve stability and to take advantage of Japan's lead in torpedo technology. They were designed to accompany the Japanese main striking force and in both day and night attacks against the United States Navy as it advanced across the Pacific Ocean, according to Japanese naval strategic projections. Despite being one of the most powerful classes of destroyers in the world at the time of their completion, only one survived the Pacific War.

 Hayashio, built at the Uraga Dock Company, was laid down on 30 June 1938, launched on 19 April 1939 and commissioned on 31 August 1940.

Operational history
At the time of the attack on Pearl Harbor, Hayashio, was assigned to Destroyer Division 15 (Desdiv 15), and a member of Destroyer Squadron 2 (Desron 2) of the IJN 2nd Fleet, and had deployed from Palau, as part of the escort for the aircraft carrier  in the invasion of the southern Philippines and minelayer .

In early 1942, Hayashio participated in the invasion of the Netherlands East Indies, escorting the invasion forces for Menado, Kendari and Ambon in January, and the invasion forces for Makassar, Timor and Java in February.

At the end of April, Hayashio deployed from Kure to assist in the occupation of the Cagayan Islands near Palawan in early May, and then returned with the damaged carrier  from Manila to Kure on 17 May. In early June, Hayashio deployed from Saipan as part of the troopship escort for the Battle of Midway.

During the Battle of the Eastern Solomons of 24 August she was part of Admiral Kondō's Advance Force, but was not in combat. During September, Hayashio was used for patrols between Truk and Guadalcanal, and in October began operations as a "Tokyo Express" high speed troop transport to Guadalcanal. These operations continued to early-February 1943. During the Naval Battle of Guadalcanal on 13–15 November, Hayashio served as flagship of the troop convoy escorts.

On 24 November 1942, while on a transport run to Lae, Hayashio was attacked by USAAF bombers (one of which, a B-17F with c/n 41-24521, claimed a direct hit to her forward turret's port side) and caught fire. Attempts to quench the fires stopped after the magazine exploded, and Cdr Kiyoshi Kaneda gave the order to abandon ship. After removing the survivors, she was scuttled by a torpedo launched by the destroyer , in Guna Bay, Huon Gulf. Hayashio was removed from the navy list on 24 December 1942.

See also 
 List of ships of the Imperial Japanese Navy

Notes

Books

External links
 CombinedFleet.com: Kagero-class destroyers
 Hayashio history

Hayashio
Hayashio
Shipwrecks in the Solomon Sea
World War II shipwrecks in the Pacific Ocean
1939 ships
Ships built by Uraga Dock Company
Maritime incidents in November 1942
Destroyers sunk by aircraft
Ships sunk by US aircraft
Naval magazine explosions